John Inglis (1833 or 1834 – 8 January 1911) was a Scottish trade union leader.

Born in Douglas, Lanarkshire, Inglis worked as a blacksmith at an ironworks in Glasgow.  He came to prominence in 1857, as a founder of the Scottish United Operative Blacksmiths' Protection and Friendly Society.  The following year, he was elected as the union's auditor, then in 1859 as its president, and in 1863 as its general secretary.

Inglis represented his union at the Trades Union Congress (TUC), serving on the Parliamentary Committee of the TUC for fifteen years, and as its chairman in 1882/3.  While on the committee, he played a leading role in campaigning for the Trade Union Act 1871, which formally legalised trade unions in the UK, the Trade Union Act 1876, and the Fatal Accident Inquiry Act.

Inglis remained secretary of the union until his retirement in 1907.  Although it remained small, under his leadership it began organising workers across the UK, and was renamed as the Associated Blacksmiths' Society.

References

1830s births
1911 deaths
British trade union leaders
Members of the Parliamentary Committee of the Trades Union Congress
Scottish trade unionists